Francisca González Garrido (1 September 1846 – 11 September 1917), better known as Fanny Garrido, was a Galician writer and translator.

Biography

Fanny Garrido was born in A Coruña in 1846, to military doctor Francisco González Garrido del Amo and Josefa García Cuenca. She married the composer Marcial del Adalid, who musicalized many of her poems. In 1873 she gave birth to their daughter, who became a noted painter. After the death of her husband, Garrido married Lugo chemist .

She contributed to the Madrid newspapers Galicia and El Correo, writing under the pseudonym Eulalia de Liáns. The most notable of her works is the autobiographical novel Escaramuzas, published in 1885, which she dedicated to her friend Emilia Pardo Bazán (with whom she had co-founded the Galician Folklore Society in 1884). She was also a translator of the German poets Heinrich Heine and Johann Wolfgang von Goethe.

Honors
Fanny Garrido was a correspondent of the Royal Galician Academy.

In December 1971, a street was named for her in her home city of A Coruña.

Works
 Escaramuzas, 1885
 La madre de Paco Pardo, 1898
 Batallas (unpublished)

References

External links

 Fanny Garrido's translation of Goethe's Italian Journey at Instituto Cervantes

1846 births
1917 deaths
19th-century Spanish women writers
Galician translators
Women writers from Galicia (Spain)
German–Spanish translators
People from A Coruña
Spanish autobiographers
Women autobiographers
19th-century translators